"Love Someone" is a song by Danish pop and soul band Lukas Graham. It was released on 7 September 2018 as the lead single from their third studio album, 3 (The Purple Album). The song was written by James Alan, Stefan Forrest, Morten Ristorp, Lukas Forchhammer, Jaramye Daniels, Morten Pilegaard and David Labrel. The song debuted at number one on the Danish Singles Chart.

The song was featured on the third episode of season 15 of The Bachelorette.

The song was also featured on the Hallmark Channel movie, Love on the Menu.

Charts

Weekly charts

Year-end charts

Certifications

Release history

References

2018 singles
2018 songs
Lukas Graham songs
Number-one singles in Denmark
Pop ballads
Songs written by Stefan Forrest
Songs written by Morten Ristorp
Songs written by Lukas Forchhammer
Copenhagen Records singles
Warner Records singles
2010s ballads